De Rietschoof is a hamlet in the Dutch province of Gelderland. It is a part of the municipality of Zaltbommel, and lies about 13 km southeast of Gorinchem.

It was first mentioned in 1847 as Rietschoof, and means bundle of reed (phragmites australis) for thatching. The postal authorities have placed it under Aalst. In 1840, it was home to 100 people. Since 2015, the hamlet has place name signs.

References

Populated places in Gelderland
Zaltbommel